Mokoko may refer to:

People
Émile Mokoko Wongolo
Jean-Marie Mokoko

Other uses
The Japanese name of the generation II Pokémon Flaaffy